Rösli Streiff (1901 – 7 February 1997) was a Swiss alpine skier and world champion.

Streiff received two gold medals at the 1932 World Championships in Cortina d'Ampezzo, winning the slalom event and the combined.

Biography 
Streiff skied her first ski races in 1928 and was a founding member of the Swiss Ladies Ski Club in 1929. In July 1929, she won the slalom of the summer ski race at Jungfraujoch, and finished third in the downhill. At the 1931 Arlberg-Kandahar races in Mürren, she finished third in the slalom and combined, and fourth in the downhill. That same year, also in Mürren, Streiff competed in the first Alpine World Ski Championships, where she achieved placings in the midfield.

At the first SDS races of the Swiss Ladies Ski Club on January 15, 1932, Streiff won all disciplines. Two weeks later she was also a triple winner in downhill, slalom and combined at the Great Ski Race of Switzerland – the Swiss Ski Championships – in Zermatt, for which, however, no championship titles were awarded at the time, only traveling prizes. Streiff reached the peak of her career in early February at the 1932 World Championships in Cortina d'Ampezzo. She first finished eighth in the downhill, and the next day became world champion in the slalom with a lead of more than ten seconds over Britain's Audrey Sale-Barker, thus also securing the world title in the combined.

References

1901 births
1997 deaths
Swiss female alpine skiers
20th-century Swiss women